Vito Corleone (born Vito Andolini) is a fictional character in Mario Puzo's 1969 novel The Godfather and in the first two of Francis Ford Coppola's film trilogy. Vito is originally portrayed by Marlon Brando in the 1972 film The Godfather, and later by Oreste Baldini as a boy and by Robert De Niro as a young man in The Godfather Part II (1974). He is an orphaned Sicilian immigrant who builds a Mafia empire.

He and his wife Carmela have four children: Santino ("Sonny"), Frederico ("Fredo"), and Michael ("Mike"), and one daughter Constanzia ("Connie"). Vito informally adopts Sonny's friend, Tom Hagen, who becomes his lawyer and consigliere. Upon Vito's death, Michael succeeds him as Don of the Corleone crime family.

Vito oversees a business founded on gambling, bootlegging, prostitution, and union corruption, but he is known as a kind, generous man who lives by a strict moral code of loyalty to friends and, above all, family. He is also known as a traditionalist who demands respect commensurate with his status; even his closest friends refer to him as "Godfather" or "Don Corleone" rather than "Vito".

Fictional biography and early years 
Vito Corleone is based on a composite of mid-20th century New York Mafia figures Carlo Gambino, Frank Costello, Joe Bonanno, and Joe Profaci.

The character's story begins as Vito Andolini in Corleone, Sicily, in the Kingdom of Italy. In the novel, he was said to be born on April 29, 1887, which his tombstone reads in the first film; however, the second film establishes his birthdate as December 7, 1891. In 1901, the local mafia chieftain, Don Ciccio, murders Vito's father Antonio when he refuses to pay him tribute. Paolo, Vito's older brother, swears revenge, but Ciccio's men kill him too. Vito's mother begs Ciccio to spare Vito, but Ciccio refuses, reasoning the boy will seek revenge as a grown man. Upon Ciccio's refusal, Vito's mother holds a knife to Ciccio's throat, allowing her son to escape while Ciccio's men kill her. Family friends smuggle Vito out of Sicily, putting him on a ship with immigrants traveling to America. At Ellis Island, an immigration official renames him Vito Corleone presumably by mistake, using his village for his surname. He later uses Andolini as his middle name in acknowledgment of his family heritage.

Vito is taken in by the Abbandando family, who are distant relatives of his, in Little Italy on New York's Lower East Side. Vito grows very close to the Abbandandos, particularly their son, Genco, who is like a brother to him. Vito earns an honest living at the Abbandandos' grocery store, but the elder Abbandando is forced to fire him when Don Fanucci, a blackhander and the local neighborhood padrone, demands that the grocery hire his nephew.

In 1920, Vito is befriended by small-time criminals Peter Clemenza and Salvatore Tessio, who teach him how to survive by fencing stolen dresses and performing favors in return for loyalty. Fanucci learns of Vito's operation and demands a cut of his illegal profits or he will report Vito and his partners to the police. Vito then devises a plan to kill Fanucci. During the festival of Saint Rocco, Vito trails Fanucci from Little Italy's rooftops, jumping from one building to the next, as Fanucci walks home. Vito enters Fanucci's building and shoots him in the chest, face and throat, killing him. Vito then takes over the neighborhood, treating it with far greater respect than Fanucci did.

Vito and Genco start the Genco Pura Olive Oil Company, an olive oil importer. It eventually becomes the nation's largest olive oil importing company, and the main legal front for Vito's growing organized crime syndicate. Between Genco Pura and his illegal operations, Vito becomes a wealthy man. In 1923, he returns to Sicily for the first time since fleeing as a child. He and his partner Don Tommasino systematically eliminate Don Ciccio's men who were involved in murdering Vito's family and arrange a meeting with Ciccio himself. The elderly Ciccio is nearly blind and deaf, and fails to recognize the now adult Vito. When Ciccio asks him to approach, he reveals himself to be the son of Antonio Andolini and carves open the elderly Don's stomach, thus avenging his family. Tommasino takes over the town and is the family's staunchest ally in the old country for the next half-century.

By the early 1930s, Vito has organized his criminal operations as the Corleone crime family, one of the most powerful in the nation. Genco Abbandando is his consigliere, and Clemenza and Tessio are caporegimes. As a boy, Vito's oldest son, Sonny, brings his friend Tom Hagen, a homeless orphan, to stay with the Corleones and Vito unofficially adopts him. As an adult, Sonny becomes a capo, Vito's heir apparent and de facto underboss. Fredo, Vito's second-born son, is deemed too weak and unintelligent to handle important family business and takes on only minor responsibilities. Vito has a difficult relationship with his youngest son, Michael, who wants nothing to do with the family business. Michael enlists to fight in World War II against Vito's wishes. When Michael is wounded in combat, Vito pulls strings to have him honorably discharged and sent back to the U.S., without Michael's knowledge.

Around 1939, Vito moves his home and base of operations to Long Beach, New York on Long Island, where Genco serves as his most trusted adviser until he is stricken with cancer and can no longer fulfill his duties. Hagen, who by now has become a practicing attorney, takes Genco's place.

Vito prides himself on being careful and reasonable, but does not completely forsake violence. When his godson, singer Johnny Fontane, wants to be released from his contract with a bandleader, Vito offers to buy him out, but the bandleader refuses. Vito then makes the bandleader an "offer he can't refuse": he has his fearsome personal assassin, Luca Brasi, put a gun to the bandleader's head, and tells the bandleader that, in five seconds, either his signature or his brains will be on the contract.

The Godfather
In 1945, Vito hosts Connie's wedding to small-time criminal Carlo Rizzi, and honors the Sicilian tradition of granting favors on his daughter's wedding day. He agrees to have Clemenza's men beat up two college students who sexually assaulted family friend Amerigo Bonasera's daughter, and to send Hagen to Hollywood to persuade movie mogul Jack Woltz to cast Fontane in his latest movie. When Woltz refuses, he wakes up to find the severed head of his prize race horse, Khartoum, in his bed; it is implied that Vito ordered the horse killed.

Soon afterward, heroin kingpin Virgil Sollozzo asks Vito to invest in his operation. Sollozzo is backed by the rival Tattaglia family, and wants Vito's political influence and legal protection. Vito declines, believing the politicians and judges on his payroll would turn against him if he engaged in drug trafficking. During the meeting, Sonny expresses interest in the deal; after the meeting, Vito chastens his son for letting an outsider know what he was thinking. Shortly afterward, as Vito goes to buy oranges from a fruit stand, Sollozzo's hitmen emerge with guns drawn. Vito runs for his Cadillac, but is shot five times. Fredo, who had been accompanying Vito, drops his gun and is unable to return fire as the assassins escape. (The murder of Frank Scalice inspired the assassination attempt on Vito.)

Vito survives, however, so Sollozzo makes a second assassination attempt at the hospital. Mark McCluskey—a corrupt police captain on Sollozzo's payroll—has removed Vito's bodyguards, leaving him unprotected. However, Michael arrives moments before the imminent attack. Realizing his father is in danger, Michael has Vito moved to another room, and affirms his loyalty at Vito's bedside.

While Vito recovers, Sonny serves as acting head of the family. Michael, knowing his father will never be safe while Sollozzo lives, convinces Sonny to let him murder Sollozzo and McCluskey. Michael lures both men to a meeting at a restaurant in The Bronx, retrieves a handgun planted by Clemenza in the bathroom, and shoots both men dead. Michael is then smuggled to Sicily under the protection of Vito's friend and business partner Don Tommasino. The deaths of Sollozzo and McCluskey ignite a war between the Corleone and Tattaglia families, with the other New York families backing the latter. After Sonny is killed by Barzini's men, Vito resumes control and brokers a peace accord among the families, during which he realizes that Barzini masterminded the attempt on his life and Sonny's murder.

Michael returns home to become Vito's heir apparent. Michael marries his girlfriend Kay Adams, and Vito retires, making Michael the operating head of the family—something Vito had never wanted for his favorite son. Vito becomes his informal consigliere, replacing Hagen.  Michael persuades Vito that it is time to remove the family from organized crime. At the same time, Michael and Vito secretly plan to eliminate the other New York dons, while allowing them to whittle away at Corleone family interests to lull them into inaction.

Vito warns Michael that Barzini will set Michael up to be killed under the guise of a meeting; Barzini will use one of the Corleone family's most trusted members as an intermediary. Shortly afterwards, on July 29, 1955, Vito dies of a heart attack in his garden while playing with his grandson, Michael's son Anthony. In the novel, his last words are, "Life is so beautiful."

At Vito's funeral, Tessio inadvertently reveals that he is the traitor when he tells Michael that Barzini wants a meeting and that he can set it up on his territory in Brooklyn, where Michael would be safe. Days later, Michael eliminates the other New York dons in a wave of assassinations. Michael also orders Tessio and Rizzi murdered for conspiring with Barzini, along with Las Vegas mobster Moe Greene, who has been stonewalling Michael's efforts to buy casinos. In one stroke, the Corleone family regains its status as the most powerful criminal organization in the country.

Sequel novels 
Vito appears in both The Godfather Returns, Mark Winegardner's 2004 sequel to Puzo's novel, and The Family Corleone, a 2012 novel by Ed Falco. These novels explore his rise to power in the 1920s and 1930s and his early relationships with his wife and children. He also appears in The Sicilian, acting as a guide for Michael while he is in Sicily.

Family 

 Carmela Corleone – wife, played by Morgana King and Francesca De Sapio
 Santino "Sonny" Corleone – eldest son; played by James Caan
 Frederico "Fredo" Corleone – middle son; played by John Cazale
 Michael Corleone – youngest son; played by Al Pacino
 Constanzia "Connie" Corleone – daughter; played by Talia Shire
 Tom Hagen – informally adopted son, played by Robert Duvall
 Francesca Corleone – granddaughter, twin of Kathryn Corleone
 Kathryn Corleone – granddaughter, twin of Francesca Corleone
 Frank Corleone – grandson
 Santino Corleone, Jr. – grandson
 Vincent Corleone – grandson; played by Andy García
 Anthony Corleone – grandson; played by Franc D'Ambrosio and James Gounaris as a child
 Mary Corleone – granddaughter; played by Sofia Coppola
 Victor Rizzi – grandson
 Michael Rizzi – grandson; played by infant Sofia Coppola

Portrayals and influences 

In The Godfather, Don Vito Corleone was portrayed by Marlon Brando. He was portrayed as a boy by Oreste Baldini and as a younger man in The Godfather Part II by Robert De Niro. Brando and De Niro’s performances won Academy Awards — Best Actor for Brando, Best Supporting Actor for De Niro. Brando declined his Oscar. He sent Sacheen Littlefeather to accept the award on his behalf, who said Brando declined it because of "the treatment of American Indians today by the film industry ... and also with recent happenings at Wounded Knee."

Marlon Brando envisaged the character to have bulldog-like jowls (hanging cheeks). In his auditions, he stuffed Kleenex tissues between his lower lips and teeth to create this appearance, which were replaced by a custom-made "plumper" oral prosthetic during filming.

For 48 years, Vito Corleone was the only role in history to have two Academy Awards won for playing it. This record was finally matched by Joaquin Phoenix winning the 2019 Best Actor Award for the role of The Joker in the film Joker, following Heath Ledger's win for Best Supporting Actor of 2008 for The Dark Knight.

Premiere Magazine listed Vito Corleone as the greatest film character in history. He was also selected as the 53rd greatest film character by Empire.

Star Wars character Marlo the Hutt was inspired by Marlon Brando's portrayal of Vito Corleone, appearing among the Hutt Council in Star Wars: The Clone Wars.

References 

Characters in American novels of the 20th century
Characters in American novels of the 21st century
Male film villains
Fictional characters from Manhattan
Fictional crime bosses
Fictional immigrants to the United States
Fictional Italian American people
Fictional Sicilian people
The Godfather characters
Literary characters introduced in 1969
Male characters in literature
Orphan characters in literature
Fictional money launderers
Fictional murderers
Fictional people from the 19th-century
Fictional people from the 20th-century
Film characters introduced in 1972